Used By You may refer to:

 "Used By You", a 2013 song by Marcus Canty from This...Is Marcus Canty
 "Used By You", a 2015 song by Metro Station from Savior